The Johns Hopkins Berman Institute of Bioethics in Baltimore, Maryland, United States, is an interdisciplinary center serving the entire Johns Hopkins University and Health System. It is dedicated to the study of complex moral and policy issues in biomedical science, health care, and health policy. Established in 1995, the Institute seeks answers to ethical questions by promoting research in bioethics and encouraging moral reflection among a broad range of scholars, professionals, students, and citizens. Contributing to its mission are four divisions of the University: the Zanvyl Krieger School of Arts and Sciences, the Johns Hopkins School of Medicine, the Bloomberg School of Public Health, and the Johns Hopkins School of Nursing.

General information

The goals of the Institute are declared in its mission statement: conducting cutting-edge, multidisciplinary research; training the next generation of leaders in bioethics; helping to prepare students and trainees for the ethical challenges of professional and civic life; informing the public about bioethical issues; and contributing to more ethical public policies and practices.

The Institute is named after Phoebe Rhea Berman, who established an endowment for the Institute, saying, "The work that is being done there has great meaning for me and can make a real difference in society." She and her husband, pioneering surgeon and best-selling author Edgar Berman, most notably went to French Equatorial Africa to work with Albert Schweitzer as extended volunteers. His work inspired her, and her commitment to the need for ethical considerations in medical and scientific decision-making was reaffirmed and strengthened.

Jeffrey Kahn is the Andreas C. Dracopoulos Director of the Berman Institute, a position he assumed in July 2016. From 2011, he has been the inaugural Robert Henry Levi and Ryda Hecht Levi Professor of Bioethics and Public Policy. He works in a variety of areas of bioethics, exploring the intersection of ethics and health/science policy, including human and animal research ethics, public health, and ethical issues in emerging biomedical technologies.

The founding director of the Institute is Ruth Faden, Ph.D., M.P.H. Dr. Faden is the author and editor of numerous books and articles on biomedical ethics and health policy including Social Justice, the Moral Foundations of Public Health and Health Policy; A History and Theory of Informed Consent; AIDS, Women and the Next Generation; and HIV, AIDS and Childbearing: Public Policy, Private Lives. She has served on several national advisory committees and commissions, including the President's Advisory Committee on Human Radiation Experiments, which she chaired.

Johns Hopkins University president William R. Brody had the following to say about the Berman Institute of Bioethics: “The Berman Institute of Bioethics is the intellectual crossroads of the University and a wonderful resource for the nation. It is at the Institute that our diverse and specialized paths of inquiry intersect. No collective undertaking is more vital to the future of Johns Hopkins.”

Programs
Research and educational programs are the foundations of the Institute's activities. The Institute's programs are divided into five main areas of focus: biomedical research and discovery; ethics of clinical practice; public health ethics and health policy; research ethics and global health ethics and research.

Biomedical Research and Discovery
The Institute focuses on two main Biomedical programs: The Stem Cell Policy and Ethics Program and The Program in Ethics and Brain Sciences. With support from the Greenwall Foundation, the Institute's (SCoPE) Program, in collaboration with the Johns Hopkins Institute for Cell Engineering, focuses on ethical issues in the transition from stem cell science to clinical research, and from clinical research to clinical practice. Program in Ethics and Brain Sciences is formed in collaboration with Johns Hopkins Brain Sciences Institute, and focuses on the careful analysis ethical and social issues of revolving around brain sciences.

Clinical Practice
The Program on Ethics in Clinical Practice (PoECP) has been established to promote education, research, and service into ethical issues in clinical and medical practice at Johns Hopkins Institutes and beyond. Research in clinical ethics focuses on ethics at the end of life, ethics and palliative care, and improving the process whereby organs are solicited and procured. The Program is funded by Morton K. and Jane Blaustein Foundation,Freeman Family Scholars Program, and The Johns Hopkins Medical Institutions.

Research Ethics
The Program in Research Ethics addresses difficult ethical challenges in research involving human subjects in the U.S. and worldwide. In partnership with faculty of the Brain Sciences Institute, the Bioethics Institute seeks to define ethical questions in the exploration of the structure and function of the brain.

Public Health and Health Policy
Building on Johns Hopkins’ leadership in public health and health policy, Institute faculty contribute to ethical and public policy questions related to HIV-AIDS and other infectious diseases, rationing and the allocation of scarce medical resources, intervention in unhealthy life styles, and disparities in health outcomes among ethnic groups and globally. The Levi Leadership Program seeks to inspire intensive moral discussion about critical issues in health and social policy among those responsible for their resolution. The Institute works with the Johns Hopkins Center for Civilian Biodefense Strategies to explore ethical questions in alternative responses to the threat of bioterrorism, with a focus on smallpox vaccine policy.

Academic Training
The Institute also develops and evaluates innovative methods for providing young clinicians with an ethics education, and performs research in clinical ethics. The Berman Institute mentors trainees through the following programs: PhD concentration in bioethics and health policy, the Greenwall Fellowship Program, the Johns Hopkins-Fogarty African Bioethics Training Program; the Arts and Sciences minor in bioethics; the bioethics certificate, and various summer intensive courses in bioethics.

See also
 Johns Hopkins Center for Health Security

References
 "Astonishing Opportunities, Unprecedented Challenges." Johns Hopkins Berman Institute of Bioethics, Johns Hopkins University.
 Freeman, J., & McDonnell, K. (2001). Tough Decisions: Cases in Medical Ethics. Oxford New York: Oxford University Press.
 Powers, Madison, and Ruth Faden. Social Justice: The Moral Foundations of Public Health and Health Policy. Oxford New York: Oxford University Press, 2006.
 Sugarman, Jeremy, ed. 20 Common Problems: Ethics in Primary Care. New York: McGraw-Hill, 2000.

External links
 The Johns Hopkins Berman Institute of Bioethics

Berman Institute
Bioethics research organizations
Research institutes in Maryland